Lucas Patterson (born September 19, 1987) is a former American football offensive lineman who played in the National Football League. Patterson was signed as undrafted free agent in 2011. Patterson has been released and re-signed to the practice squad multiple times since his rookie season and has had only very brief stints on the Kansas City Chiefs active roster. Patterson has also played for the New England Patriots during their 2013 preseason but was released following an injury settlement.

References

External links
Kansas City Chiefs bio
Texas A&M Aggies bio

1987 births
Living people
Kansas City Chiefs players
People from Kingsville, Texas